The Seamstress (Czech: Švadlenka) is a 1936 German comedy film, produced in Czechoslovakia at the A-B Film Studio with a Czech cast and crew and in the Czech language, by the German film company UFA.  
It was directed by Martin Frič and starring Lída Baarová, Theodor Pištěk and Hugo Haas.

The film's sets were designed by the art director Štěpán Kopecký.

Cast
 Lída Baarová as Líza Bártová (as Ludmila Babková)
 Theodor Pištěk as Bárta
 Hugo Haas as Francois Lorrain
 Bedřich Veverka as Alfons
 Adina Mandlová as Mici
 Růžena Šlemrová as Salon owner Yvette
 Věra Ferbasová as Tonka
 Václav Trégl as Houžvička
 Vladimír Borský as Jan Tomáš Krejčí
 Felix Kühne as Journalist
 Jaroslav Marvan as Professor
 Eduard Šimáček as Journalist

References

External links
 

1936 films
1936 comedy films
1930s Czech-language films
Czechoslovak black-and-white films
Films directed by Martin Frič
UFA GmbH films
Czechoslovak comedy films
1930s Czech films